The Akaflieg Stuttgart fs26 Moseppl is a German single-seat motor glider with twin fins and rudders designed and built by Akaflieg Stuttgart. First flown on the 25 September 1970 it was designed as an experiment and not intended for production.

Design
The fs26 Moseppl is a cantilever high-wing monoplane with a monocoque nacelle fuselage and a glassfibre/balsa sandwich wing structure, fitted with airbrakes but no flaps or ailerons. To make room for the engine the Moseppl has twin fins and rudders attached to the wing trailing edge with an all-moving tailplane between the tops of the vertically surfaces. The pilot sits in an enclosed cockpit with a transparent canopy and the landing gear is a retracting rear monowheel and non-steerable nosewheel. The rear-mounted engine is a   Solo-Hirth engine with a variable pitch pusher propeller.

Specifications

See also

References

Notes

Bibliography

1970s German sailplanes
Single-engined pusher aircraft
Twin-boom aircraft
Motor gliders
Aircraft first flown in 1970
Akaflieg Stuttgart aircraft